The GFA League Second Division is the second highest division of football in Gambia.

2017/18 Participants
BK Milan
Brufut United
Gunjur United
Immigration 
Kexx United (Wellingara)
Latrikunda United
 Lions (Banjul)
 Red Hawks
Samger (Kanifing)
Serrekunda East Bi
Serrekunda United
Waa Banjul
Wallidan FC
Young Africans (Banjul)

Previous champions
2003/04 : Kaira Silo
2005 : Interior FC
2006 : Sait Matty Football Club
2007 : Interior FC
2008 : Brikama United
2009 : Gambia Ports Authority
2010 : Africell Football Club (Bakau)
2011 : Banjul Hawks FC
2012 : Interior FC
2013 : Wallidan
2014 : Bombada United (Brikama)
2015-16: Marimoo FC
2017-18: Samger FC

Football leagues in the Gambia